Democracy – Responsibility – Morality – Courage – Patriotism (DOMOV) until 2014 known as Party for Dignified Life (SDŽ) is a social democratic political party in the Czech Republic founded in 2007 by Jana Volfová who became the party's first chairwoman. Vice chairs are Eva Morávková, Daniel Bernard, Marie Paukejová, Marcela Kozerová, Miroslav Neubert, and Vladimír Pelc. Former Prime Minister Miloš Zeman was nomited party's patron.

Footnotes

External links 
 Official page 

Political parties established in 2007
2007 establishments in the Czech Republic
Social democratic parties in the Czech Republic